Lech is an English word referring to lecherous behavior or person.

Lech may also refer to:

People
 Lech (name), a name of Polish origin
 Lech, founder of Poland, the figure from the legendary Lech, Czech, and Rus
 Lech (Bohemian prince) (d. 805), medieval Slavic tribal ruler

Places

 Lech (river) in Austria and Germany
 Lech am Arlberg, a village and noble ski resort in Vorarlberg, Austria
 Lechia, an ancient name of Poland

Products and organizations

 Lech (beer), Polish beer produced by Kompania Piwowarska, in Poznań
 Lech Poznań, football club in Poznań
 Lech Poznań II, the reserve team of Lech Poznań
 Lech Rypin, football club in Rypin
 Lech (airship), the first Polish zeppelin
 Lech (motorcycle), defunct Polish motorcycle manufacturer

Other uses

 "Lech", a song by Slipknot from .5: The Gray Chapter
 Lech Coaster, a roller coaster in Poland

See also
 Lechia (disambiguation)
 Leck (disambiguation)